In enzymology, a zeatin 9-aminocarboxyethyltransferase is an enzyme that catalyzes the chemical reaction

O-acetyl-L-serine + zeatin  lupinate + acetate

Thus, the two substrates of this enzyme are O-acetyl-L-serine and zeatin, whereas its two products are lupinate and acetate.

This enzyme belongs to the family of transferases, specifically those transferring aryl or alkyl groups other than methyl groups.  The systematic name of this enzyme class is O3-acetyl-L-serine:zeatin 2-amino-2-carboxyethyltransferase. Other names in common use include beta-(9-cytokinin)-alanine synthase, beta-(9-cytokinin)alanine synthase, O-acetyl-L-serine acetate-lyase (adding N6-substituted adenine), lupinate synthetase, lupinic acid synthase, lupinic acid synthetase, and 3-O-acetyl-L-serine:zeatin 2-amino-2-carboxyethyltransferase.

References

 
 

EC 2.5.1
Enzymes of unknown structure